Abol-Hasan Golestaneh was an Iranian government official from Isfahan, who wrote the historical chronicle of Mojamal al-Tawarikh in 1780. It was an important source for the events that followed after the death of the Iranian ruler Nader Shah, including the establishment of the Durrani Empire by the Afghan ruler Ahmad Shah Durrani, as well as the political affairs in western Iran between 1747 and 1782.

References

Sources 
 
 

Year of birth unknown
Year of death unknown
Writers from Isfahan
18th-century writers of Safavid Iran
People from Afsharid Iran
People of the Zand dynasty
18th-century Iranian historians